Port Gibson is a hamlet and census-designated place (CDP) in the town of Manchester, Ontario County, New York, United States. As of the 2010 census, it had a population of 453.

Geography
The CDP is in northern Ontario County, in the northeast corner of the town of Manchester. It is bordered to the north by the Erie Canal. New York State Route 31, following the canal, runs through the northern edge of the community, leading east  to Newark and northwest  to Palmyra.

The Port Gibson United Methodist Church was listed on the National Register of Historic Places in 1996.
A U. S. Post Office is located in Port Gibson with a ZIP code of 14537, but a small portion of Port Gibson uses the Clifton Springs postal code of 14432.

Port Gibson is Ontario County's lone land access to the NYS Barge Canal (formerly Erie Canal).

Demographics

References 

Census-designated places in Ontario County, New York
Census-designated places in New York (state)
Erie Canal